Static may refer to:

Places
Static Nunatak, in Antarctica
Static, Kentucky and Tennessee, U.S.
Static Peak, a mountain in Wyoming, U.S.
Static Peak Divide, a mountain pass near the peak

Science and technology

Physics
Static electricity, a net charge of an object
Triboelectric effect, due to frictional contact between different materials
Static spacetime, a spacetime having a global, non-vanishing, timelike Killing vector field which is irrotational
Statics, a branch of physics concerned with physical systems in equilibrium
Hydrostatics, the branch of fluid mechanics that studies fluids at rest

Engineering
Static pressure, in aircraft instrumentation and fluid dynamics
Static port, a proprietary sensor used on aircraft to measure static pressure
White noise or static noise, a random signal with a flat power spectral density
Radio noise, in radio reception
Noise (video), the random black-and-white image produced by televisions attempting to display a weak or incoherent signal

Computing
Static build, a compiled version of a program which has been statically linked against libraries
Static logic, digital logic which does not use a clock signal; See Dynamic logic
Static core, a CPU entirely implemented in static logic
Static library, or statically-linked library, a set of routines, external functions and variables which are resolved in a caller at compile-time
Static method, a method of a class that does not need an explicit object reference
Static IP, an IP address
Static route, a network route specified by local configuration, rather than being automatically determined by protocols that automatically assign routes
Static random-access memory, a type of semiconductor memory which retains its contents as long as power is applied
Static type checking, where type checking is applied at compile-time, not run-time
Static variable, a variable whose lifetime is the entire run of the program
Static (keyword)
Static web page
Static web design, a web design which offers a layout that cannot adapt to viewer needs

Arts and entertainment

Music

Artists
Static Major (1974–2008), an American R&B singer and songwriter, originally known as Static
Static-X, an American industrial metal band
Wayne Static (1965–2014), frontman, vocalist and guitarist of Static-X
Static, one half of the American music duo Collide
Static (born 1990), one half of the Israeli music duo Static & Ben El Tavori
DJ Static, the name of various DJs

Albums
Static (Bleach album), 1998, and the title song
Static (Cults album), 2013
Static, a 2017 album by Dave Kerzner
Static (Huntress album), 2015, and the title song
Static, a 1999 live album by Mr. Big
Static (Planet Funk album), 2006, and the title song

Songs
"Static", a 1983 single by Planet P Project from the album Planet P Project
"Static" (song), a 1988 funk song by Full Force and James Brown
"Static", a 1989 song by Tupac Shakur
"Static", a 2006 song by Livin Out Loud from the album What About Us

Fictional characters
Static character, a character who does not undergo significant change during the course of a story
Static (DC Comics), a Milestone and DC Comics superhero
Static (Eclipse Comics), a superhero created by writer-artist Steve Ditko

Film and television
Static (1985 film), an American comedy-drama film
Static (2012 film), an American horror film
"Static" (The Twilight Zone), a 1961 episode of The Twilight Zone

See also
Static program analysis, a set of methods for analyzing code without running it